University Hospital Waterford, formerly known as Waterford Regional Hospital (WRH), is a teaching hospital located in Waterford, County Waterford, Ireland. It is managed by South/Southwest Hospital Group.

History
The hospital has its origins in the Ardkeen Chest Hospital which was established in 1952. After services had been transferred from St. Patrick's Hospital, Waterford in 1959, the chest hospital developed into a general hospital known as Waterford Regional Hospital (WRH). New facilities including a new accident and emergency department, a new neonatal unit, and a new CT scanning unit were officially opened by James Reilly, Minister of Health, in May 2014. The hospital was renamed University Hospital Waterford at that time.

In April 2019, it was claimed that bodies had been 'left to decompose' on trolleys at the hospital.

In 2016 local businessman Matt Shanahan began a campaign to improve UHW cardiology services with a second cath lab and 24/7 percutaneous coronary intervention capability. It was the main plank of his successful election campaigns as an independent candidate in the 2019 local election and the 2020 general election.

Services
The hospital provides 429 beds, of which 71 are reserved for acute day cases.  A further 45 beds are for psychiatric services. University College Cork is its primary academic partner, and it is also affiliated with the Royal College of Surgeons in Ireland and Waterford Institute of Technology.

References

Hospital buildings completed in 1952
1952 establishments in Ireland
Buildings and structures in Waterford (city)
Hospitals established in 1952
Health Service Executive hospitals
Hospitals in County Waterford
20th-century architecture in the Republic of Ireland